Old Laund Booth is a civil parish in Pendle, Lancashire, England. It contains 17 listed buildings that are recorded in the National Heritage List for England.  All of the listed buildings are designated at Grade II, the lowest of the three grades, which is applied to "buildings of national importance and special interest".  The parish contains the villages of Fence and Wheatley, and surrounding countryside.  Most of the listed buildings are houses and associated structures, farmhouses and farm buildings, the others being two churches, a school, and a public house.

Buildings

References

Citations

Sources

Lists of listed buildings in Lancashire
Buildings and structures in the Borough of Pendle